San Juan High School may refer to:
San Juan High School (California)
San Juan High School (Utah)